Ryan Karhut (born September 9, 1981) is a Canadian football guard. He was drafted by the Saskatchewan Roughriders in the fifth round of the 2007 CFL Draft and then the Riders traded a 1st and 4th round 2008 Canadian College Draft pick along with OL Ryan Karhut to the Alouettes to get Childs along with OL Brain Jones. He played CIS football for the Manitoba Bisons 2005 to 2007. Ryan captained the Vanier Cup winning Bisons in 2007. Prior to that he play at the University of Central Florida following a five-year stint with the Edmonton Huskies of the CJFL.

Ryan is currently the special teams coordinator and defensive line coach for York University. Prior to that Ryan was the head coach of the Winnipeg Rifles.

External links
Montreal Alouettes bio
http://www.winnipegsun.com/2012/11/26/winnipeg-rifles-name-new-top-gun
http://www.winnipegfreepress.com/our-communities/sports/New-coach-aims-to-rebuild-Rifles-182040151.html
http://www.winnipegfreepress.com/sports/amateur/Rifles-name-new-coach-180942401.html
http://mytoba.ca/sports/coach-karhut-changing-the-culture-with-winnipeg-rifles/
http://thehuddle.co/huddle/wilson-gets-his-man-karhut-new-head-coach-of-the-rifles/
http://voices.suntimes.com/sports/inside-the-bears/former-allouettes-offensive-li/
http://www.winnipegsun.com/2014/08/17/rifles-set-to-open-season-sunday
http://www.winnipegfreepress.com/our-communities/souwester/Following-one-passion-creating-a-dream-205442081.html
http://www.winnipegfreepress.com/sports/football/prospects-ogidan-prime-shine-at-junior-rifles-rookie-camp-269329031.html

1981 births
Living people
Sportspeople from Regina, Saskatchewan
Canadian football offensive linemen
Manitoba Bisons football players
Saskatchewan Roughriders players
Montreal Alouettes players
Players of Canadian football from Saskatchewan